An art school is an educational institution with a primary focus on the visual arts, including fine art – especially illustration, painting, photography, sculpture, and graphic design. Art schools can offer elementary, secondary, post-secondary, or undergraduate programs, and can also offer a broad-based range of programs (such as the liberal arts and sciences). There have been six major periods of art school curricula, and each one has had its own hand in developing modern institutions worldwide throughout all levels of education. Art schools also teach a variety of non-academic skills to many students.

History 
Nicholas Houghton identifies six definitive historical art-school curricula: "apprentice, academic, formalist, expressive, conceptual, and professional".
Each of these curricula have aided not only the way that modern art-schools teach, but also how students learn about art.

Art schools began being perceived as legitimate universities in the 1980s. Before this, any art programs were used purely as extracurricular activities,
and there were no methods of grading works. After the 1980s, however, art programs were integrated into many different kinds of schools and universities as legitimate courses that could be evaluated. While some argue that this has weakened creativity among modern art-students, others see this as a way to treat fine arts equally in comparison with other subjects.

Apprentice curriculum 
Apprentice paths teach art as a mixture of aesthetic and function. Typically, students would apprentice themselves to someone who was already skilled in some sort of trade in exchange for food and housing. Many of the Old Masters received training in this manner, copying or painting in the style of their teacher in order to learn the trade. Once the apprenticeship ended, the student would have to prove what they learned by creating what we know today as a "masterpiece". In modern schooling, this can be seen in practical art classes, including photography or printmaking.

Academic curriculum 
Academic curricula began during the sixteenth-century Italian Renaissance, in which some of the earliest art academies were established. Up through the nineteenth century, these academies multiplied through both Europe and North America, and art began to become about both talent and intellect.

Formalist curriculum 

The formalist curriculum began in the mid-twentieth century, and focused on the basic components of artwork, such as "color, shape, texture, line - and a concern with the particular properties of a material or medium". This curriculum is most noted for including the height in popularity of Bauhaus. It was based on logic, mathematics, and Neoplatonism, which was universal at the time.

Expressive curriculum 
Although the expressive curriculum originated at the same time as the formalist one, it focuses on completely different aspects of art. Rather than being concerned with the literal components of a piece of art, expressive curricula encouraged students to express their emotions and practice spontaneity. This is due to the heightened popularity of romanticism throughout the Renaissance.

Conceptual curriculum 
The conceptual curriculum began in the late-twentieth century, and focused not only on creating artwork, but also on presenting and describing the thought process behind the work. This is when the idea of critiquing others' works for educational purposes became popularized in North America (as the concept had been shut down quickly in Europe). This serves as a model for modern-day art school programs.

Professional curriculum 
Professional curricula began appearing in art schools at the very end of the twentieth century. They teach students artistry from a perspective of business, and typically focus on modern pop-culture within the works themselves. These programs are designed to teach students how to promote both themselves and their artwork.

Modern 
A wide variety of art mediums and styles are integrated into modern art school programs. Different mediums that are taught include painting, printmaking, drawing and illustration, theatre, and sculpture. Newer programs can include graphic design, filmmaking, graffiti art, and certain kinds of digital media.

Online
In recent years a number of art schools have begun to offer some or all of their curricula online, which by nature, transcends national boundaries. Among these are The Art Institute of Pittsburgh Online and Academy of Art University. As with on-ground schools, many of the majors involve computer-based work, such as compositions created in Photoshop, Illustrator, or 3D-Studio Max. Submission and review of these materials proceeds virtually identically for on-ground and online classes. When online courses require production of traditional drawings or other such materials, they usually are photographed or scanned for submission and review by instructors.

In early education 
According to the International Journal of Art and Design Education, "mainstream educational contexts could foster drawing behaviour and the related emotional benefits to a greater extent". Throughout a study done in the United Kingdom, it was determined that children whose parents or guardians involved them in drawing from an early age had a stronger connection with art. These children were shown to have better art skills and a significantly better chance at pursuing a career in fine arts.

Art schools and mental health 
A study done by Bryan Goodwin that focused on the "Mozart effect", which refers to the idea that listening to classical music is beneficial toward mental and intellectual development, discovered that art education is useful to students of any age. It was discovered that learning both music and art within one's education were helpful in processing symptoms for those with PTSD, anxiety, and depression.

Notable art schools

North America

Canada 
 Alberta University of the Arts
 Emily Carr University of Art and Design
 NSCAD University
 OCAD University

Canada

Universities and colleges
There are four independent art and design universities in Canada, all public institutions. They are Emily Carr University of Art and Design (Vancouver), NSCAD University (Halifax), OCAD University (Toronto), and Alberta College of Art and Design (Calgary).

Emily Carr University has the most active research program among the four with over $15 million in research over the last five years. OCAD University's research intensity has reached $3.2 million in 2011–12. All four schools teach in the major disciplines from painting through to new media and design. Over the last five years, Emily Carr has garnered the most of the major awards for students and alums across the country.

NSCAD University was founded in 1887 by Anna Leonowens and other Halifax women. The school gained international prominence in the 1970s for innovation in conceptual art under the leadership of Garry Kennedy. In spite of its modest size, Art in America suggested in 1973 that NSCAD was "the best art school in North America", while more recently The Globe and Mail called it Canada's "most illustrious".

The teaching of visual art at Mount Allison University can be traced back to the opening of the Women's Academy in 1854. It has been an important part of the curriculum since that time. In 1941, Mount Allison was the first university in Canada to give a Bachelor of Fine Arts degree in the visual arts. Much of the department's history was, and is, directly related to the Owens Art Gallery. Until 1965, when the department moved to its own quarters in the Gairdner Fine Arts Building, the department was housed in the gallery. Since that time the gallery has been extensively remodelled into one of the largest in the Maritimes, serving both the university and community. In 2014, the department moved to a new contemporary state of the art studio facility in the Purdy Crawford Centre for the Arts. And in 2020, the Pierre Lassonde School of Fine Arts was established through philanthropic support, and builds on the program's long-standing history in and support of the arts and will bolster new learning, scholarship, and arts initiatives.

Secondary schools (Ontario area)
Claude Watson School for the Arts and Karen Kain School of the Arts are intermediate-age public art schools in Toronto, Ontario. They are continued by the Claude Watson program at Earl Haig Secondary School and by the Etobicoke School of the Arts, Rosedale Heights School of the Arts, Wexford Collegiate School for the Arts, and the Catholic board Cardinal Carter Academy for the Arts.

In Brampton, Mayfield Secondary School's Regional Arts Program offers a public high school-level art school. Mississauga's Cawthra Park Secondary School offers the Regional Arts Program within a public high school-level art school as well. St. Roch Catholic Secondary School and St. Thomas Aquinas Secondary School have regional arts programs at the Catholic high school level.

Canterbury High School, in Ottawa's Urbandale neighbourhood, is an arts magnet school.

United States 
 Academy of Art University
 California Institute of the Arts
 College for Creative Studies
 Kendall College of Art and Design
 Maine College of Art
 Moore College of Art and Design
 Pacific Northwest College of Art
 Parsons School of Design
 Pennsylvania Academy of the Fine Arts
 Pratt Institute
 Rhode Island School of Design
 Ringling College of Art and Design
 Sam Fox School of Design & Visual Arts
 Savannah College of Art and Design
 School of the Art Institute of Chicago
 The University of the Arts
 Vermont College of Fine Arts
 Virginia Commonwealth University School of the Arts
 Yale School of Art
 University of North Carolina School of the Arts

United States 

In the U.S., art and design schools that offer Bachelor of Fine Arts or Master of Fine Arts degrees break down into basic types with some overlap and variations.

The most highly rated schools belong to a consortium formed in 1991 and called the Association of Independent Colleges of Art and Design (AICAD). These schools differ from for-profit career schools in that they require a strong component of liberal arts courses in addition to art and design courses, providing a well-rounded college degree.

There also are partnerships between art schools and universities such as School of the Art Institute of Chicago with Roosevelt University, the New England School of Art and Design at Suffolk University, Art Institute of Boston at Lesley University, the Rhode Island School of Design with Brown University, Maryland Institute College of Art and Johns Hopkins University, the Corcoran College of Art and Design with The George Washington University, the School of the Museum of Fine Arts in conjunction with Tufts University, Tyler School of Art at Temple University, Parsons School of Design at The New School, or Herron School of Art at Indiana University.

There is at least one state-supported independent art school in the U.S., Fashion Institute of Technology, which is part of the state university school system in New York, and Massachusetts College of Art and Design.

Cooper Union in New York City is among the most selective of art schools, admitting 4%, with every student on half scholarship.  The Yale School of Art at Yale University offers only graduate classes in its two-year MFA programs.  The Yale Daily News reported on Thursday, February 1, 2007, that the School had 1215 applications for its class of 2009 and would offer admission to fifty-five students.

Next up the scale in size for an art school would be a large art or design department, school, or college at a university. If it is a college, such as the College of Design at Iowa State University typically, it would contain programs that teach studio art, graphic design, photography, architecture, landscape architecture, interior design, or interior architecture, as well as art, design, and architectural history areas. Sometimes these are simply the schools of art, architecture, and design such as those at the College of Fine and Applied Arts at the University of Illinois at Urbana-Champaign or the Yale School of Art. With over 3,000 students, VCU School of the Arts at Virginia Commonwealth University is one of the largest art schools in the nation and is also has achieved the highest ranking ever for a public university. Variation exists among art schools that are larger institutions, however, the essential element is that programs at universities tend to include more liberal arts courses and slightly less studio work, when compared to dedicated, but independent, schools of art.

The final and most common type of art school, a state supported or private program, would be at a university or college. It typically is a BA program, but also might be a BFA, MA, or MFA. These programs tend to emphasize a more general degree in art and do not require a major in a specific field, but might offer concentrations. A concentration is not accepted by some accrediting or professional organizations as being adequate preparation in some fields that would lead to success as a professional. This is the case for graphic design, where typically, the minimal degree is a BFA major in graphic design.

Many of the degree-offering institutions do not offer intense training in classical realism and academic painting and drawing. The Lyme Academy College of Fine Arts is considered a collegiate version of this educational model. This gap is filled by Atelier art schools (schools located inside an artist's studio) or in separate locations, such as the New York Academy of Art, the National Academy of Design, the New York Studio School, the Pennsylvania Academy of the Fine Arts (PAFA), established 1805, the Art Students League of New York, established in 1875.

South America 
 Guignard University of Art of Minas Gerais, Belo Horizonte, Minas Gerais, Brazil
 Imperial Academy of Fine Arts, Rio de Janeiro, Brazil
 School of Communications and Arts, University of São Paulo

United Kingdom

Perhaps those generally felt most applicable to the definition of 'art school' are the autonomous colleges or schools of art offering courses across both further and higher education boundaries, of which there are approximately eighteen, under the banner of United Kingdom Art & Design Institutions Association. Others, whose existence ties in indelibly with that of larger, non-discipline-specific universities (such as the Slade School of Art) exist. Most art schools of either orientation are equipped to offer opportunities spanning from post-16 to postgraduate level.

The range of colleges span from predominantly further education establishments to research-led specialist institutes. The University of the Arts London, for example, is a federally structured institution that comprises six previously independent schools situated in London. These include Camberwell College of Arts, Central Saint Martins, Chelsea College of Arts, London College of Communication, London College of Fashion, and Wimbledon College of Arts; others include The Slade School of Fine Art, The Royal College of Art and Goldsmiths College, University of London, which each grant undergraduate and postgraduate awards under one collegiate arm. The Royal College of Art with its degree-awarding arm and singular focus on postgraduate awards being a most singular exception.

Outside of London art schools in the UK include Arts University Bournemouth, Coventry School of Art and Design,  University for the Creative Arts, Duncan of Jordanstone College of Art & Design, Edinburgh College of Art (part of University of Edinburgh), Glasgow School of Art, Gray's School of Art, Hereford College of Arts, Leeds College of Art, Liverpool School of Art (part of Liverpool John Moores University), Loughborough University School of Art and Design, Manchester School of Art (part of Manchester Metropolitan University), Norwich University of the Arts, Moray School of Art (University of the Highlands and Islands), The Northern School of Art and Plymouth College of Art and Design.

Since the 1970s, degrees have replaced diplomas as the top-tier qualification in the field.

In the case of wholly freestanding institutions, degree validation agreements in liaison with a university have long been the custom for Bachelor of Arts (Hons) level upward. There has been a general trend for all-encompassing universities to offer programs in the visual arts, and formerly independent art schools have merged with polytechnics and universities to offer such degrees. A notable exception to this is the City and Guilds of London Art School, an independent art school solely focused on fine art and related disciplines such as carving and conservation. A few art schools have taken on university status themselves, namely Arts University Bournemouth, University for the Creative Arts, University of the Arts London, and Norwich University of the Arts. While Courtauld Institute of Art, Leeds College of Art and Royal College of Art are recognised institutions - some with degree awarding powers.

Most specialist institutions in the United Kingdom can trace their histories back to the nineteenth century or beyond, originating usually from government initiatives.

Europe 

 Academy of Fine Arts of Brera
 Academy of Fine Arts Nuremberg
 Berlin University of the Arts
 École des Beaux-Arts 
 Hochschule für Grafik und Buchkunst Leipzig
 National M. K. Čiurlionis School of Art
 Konstfack
 Leeds Arts University
 Manchester School of Art 
 Plymouth College of Art
 Royal Academy of Art, The Hague
 Royal Academy of Arts
 Slade School of Fine Art

Italy
In Italy there are twenty Academies of Fine Arts sustained by the state and eighteen private and public academies legally recognized. All these academies, together with all the music conservatories, institutes of musical studies and other educational institutes, converge in a specific compartment of the Italian Ministry of university and Research named AFAM (Alta Formazione Artistica, Musicale e Coreutica).

France
In France, art schools have a long history. The oldest is Paris fine art school, established in 1682, and most present public art schools are over two centuries old : Nancy (1708), Toulouse (1726), Rouen (1741), etc. Some of those schools were called academies and were prestigious institutions, devoted to the education of great painters or sculptors. Others were called "école gratuite de dessin" (free school for drawing), and were devoted to the education of arts and craft artists.
Currently, there are in France 45 national or territorial public schools of art, that deliver bachelor (DNA) and master (DNSEP) degrees. They do not belong to universities.

Germany 
The Academy of Fine Arts Nuremberg (German: Akademie der Bildenden Künste Nürnberg) was founded in 1662 by Jacob von Sandrart and is the oldest art academy in German-speaking Central Europe. Fine and applied arts have since formed key sectors of learning, although emphasises have shifted in one direction or the other over the centuries. Today learning takes the form of interdisciplinary interaction, the dialogue between fine and applied disciplines. It is flanked by new degree courses and a new media technology study programme.

The Netherlands 
There are many famous art institutions in the Netherlands and many of them with long traditions. and had made great impact of the world thought the history. Royal Academy of art, The Hague founded year 1682 is the largest and oldest art institution in the Netherlands. Design Academy Eindhoven founded 1955 is today considered one of the best design and art schools in the world. Gerrit Rietveld Academie is another well known school founded in 1924 in Amsterdam with main focus on De Stijl and Bauhaus at that time.

Sweden
Art schools have had a history in Sweden since the first half of the 18th century. Students may attend the Royal Institute of Art, which got its start in 1735.  Established in 1844 originally as a part-time art school for Sunday artisans, the University College of Arts, Crafts and Design known as "Konstfack" is an arts college offering bachelor's and master's degrees in ceramics, glass, textiles, metalworking, and more.

There are also tertiary art schools attached to universities in Gothenburg, Malmö and Umeå.

Indonesia 
The first Art School in Indonesia was Universitaire Leergang voor Tekenleraren en Handenarbeit located in Bandung, part of Technical Faculty of Universiteit van Indonesie (Indonesian: Fakultas Teknik Universitas Indonesia). The school was initiated by Simon Admiraal (Art Teacher from Jakarta Lyceum), and Ries Mulder (Hollands Artist) in the year 1947. Now, the school is integrated to Institut Teknologi Bandung as Faculty of Art and Design, in the same location as previous school. Following the establishment of Universitaire Leergang, in 1950 ASRI (Indonesian Visual Art Academy) was opened in Jogjakarta, now ISI Jogjakarta. Currently there is a prominent Art School in every major Islands in Indonesia, following the establishment of ISI (Indonesian Art Institute) and ISBI (Indonesian Art and Culture Institute) in every major Islands/cities, like ISI Surakarta, ISI Denpasar, ISBI Aceh, ISBI Papua, ISBI Kalimantan, and ISBI Bandung. There are also prominent private art school/program in Indonesia namely Institut Kesenian Jakarta (Jakarta Arts Institute), visual arts program at Telkom University in Bandung, and also at Maranatha University.

Asia 
 Aichi Prefectural University of the Arts  (Public university)
 Bulbul Lalitakaka Academy
 China Academy of Art
 Government College of Art & Craft
 Kala Bhavana
 Kanazawa College of Art  (Public university)
 Kyoto City University of Arts  (Public university)
 Kyoto University of the Arts
 Okinawa Prefectural University of Arts  (Public university)
 Painting School of Fine Arts
 Rabindra Bharati University
 Shanto-Mariam University of Creative Technology
 Srishti School of Art Design and Technology
 Tsinghua University
 Telkom University
 Tokyo University of the Arts  (

Africa 

 Michaelis School of Fine Art
 National School of the Arts
 Pan-African School of Art
 Ruth Prowse School of Fine Art
 University of Nairobi

Australia 
Art schools in Australia are mostly located within Australian universities as a result of the Dawkins higher education reforms of the late 1980s. Prior to the Dawkins reforms, there was a mix of university-based art schools and single-discipline colleges of art. Art schools are now represented by the peak body, the Australian Council of University Art and Design Schools (ACUADS), which was founded in 1981 and was originally called the National Council of Heads of Art and Design Schools. ACUADS has 30 members:

 Adelaide Central School of Art
 Adelaide College of the Arts, TAFE SA
 ANU School of Art & Design (Australian National University)
 Fashion Design Studio Sydney, TAFE NSW
 School of Creative Arts and Humanities, Charles Darwin University
 School of Communication and Creative Industries, Charles Sturt University
 School of Design and Art, Curtin University of Technology
 School of Communication & Creative Arts, Deakin University Australia
 School of Arts and Humanities, Edith Cowan University
 School of Arts, Federation University
 Queensland College of Art, Griffith University
 Department of Creative Arts and English, La Trobe University
 Fine Art Department, Monash University
 National Art School
 Art & Design, North Metropolitan TAFE
 School of Design, Queensland University of Technology
 School of Art, RMIT University
 School of Arts & Social Sciences, Southern Cross University
 School of Design, Swinburne University of Technology
 Design Vertical, Torrens University
 Faculty of Arts & Design, University of Canberra
 Victorian College of the Arts, University of Melbourne
 UNSW Art & Design
 School of Art, Architecture and Design, University of South Australia
 School of Arts and Communication, University of Southern Queensland
 Sydney College of the Arts, University of Sydney
 School of Creative Arts, University of Tasmania
 School of Design, University of Technology Sydney
 School of Design, University of Western Australia
 School of Humanities & Communication Arts, University of Western Sydney
 School of the Arts, English and Media, University of Wollongong

There are other art schools in Australia, such as the Julian Ashton Art School, but they are either not accredited by TEQSA to award degrees or are private, for-profit institutions that sit outside the university system.

See also

 Academy figure
 Visual arts education
 Kunstgewerbeschule
 List of art schools
 List of art schools in Europe
 List of artist-initiated schools

References

External links 
 ACUADS